School District 122 may refer to:
 Harlem School District 122
 La Salle Elementary Public Schools No 122
 New Lenox School District 122
 Ridgeland School District 122